Samadabad (also Romanized as Şamadābād; also known as Kalāteh-ye Māmkhān) is a village in Tajan Rural District, in the Central District of Sarakhs County, Razavi Khorasan Province, Iran. At the 2006 census, its population was 616, in 117 families.

References 

Populated places in Sarakhs County